The Guam Institute, located off in Guam Highway 1 in Hagåtña (Agana), Guam, was listed on the U.S. National Register of Historic Places in 1977;  the listing included one contributing building.  It was built in 1911.  It has also been known as the Jose P. Lujan House.

The house is significant as one of few houses in Agana surviving from before World War II.  It was built by carpenter and cabinet-maker Jose Pangelinan Lujan, who rented the house and later lived in it, until moving out of the house in 1928.  Lujan owned the house until 1969.

The house was the location of the Guam Institute, "the only successful private school of the pre-war period" in Guam, from 1928 until the institute was closed in December, 1941, with the Japanese invasion.

The house was damaged by Typhoon Pamela in 1976;  photos in 1977 showed it in poor condition.

However, supported by the NRHP listing, the owner obtained Federal matching grant funds to support rehabilitation of the building during 1980–1982.  Work done used "design, materials (ifil wood), and workmanship to maintain the original character of the building."

It is one of five pre-World War II houses that make up the NRHP-listed Agana Historic District.

See also
National Register of Historic Places listings in Guam

References 

Buildings and structures on the National Register of Historic Places in Guam
School buildings completed in 1911
Schools in Guam
Houses in Guam
Individually listed contributing properties to historic districts on the National Register in Guam
1911 establishments in Guam
Educational institutions disestablished in 1941
Buildings and structures in Hagåtña, Guam
Education in Hagåtña, Guam